is a Japanese actor who plays the role of Ankh/Shingo Izumi in Kamen Rider OOO. He is the third son of actor Kōichi Miura and idol Arisu Jun; he has an older brother who is also an actor: Kōuta Miura. His acting debut was in the 2002 movie Ogya. In January 2012, Miura reprise his role in Super Hero Taisen (2012), In February 2012, Miura has pulled out from Super Hero Taisen, five years later Miura reprise his role in Kamen Rider Heisei Generation FINAL (2017), In July 2012, he made his singing debut with the single "Natsu dayo Honey!!" (Honey, It's summer).

Filmography

TV series

Films

Theaters and stage
 Sutā Tanjō (2004)
 Bambino(2006)
 Bambino+(2006) 
 Bambino.2(2007) 
 Bambino+ in Yokohama (2007)
 Bambino+ in apple (2008)
 Bambino.3&+ (2009)
 Bambino. Final! (2012)
 Boku no Yotsuya kaidan (2012)
 Never Let me Go (2014) (Apr 29 to May 15)
 The Shawshank Redemption (December 2014)
 Verona no ni shinshi (2014)
 Tegami (2016)
 Kuroshitsuji: Noah's Ark Circus (2016)
 Kumikyoku Vol.14 "Douka yami wo, Kimi ni" (2017)
 Grand Guignol (2017)
 Shitsunawa reta ai no iro (2017)
 1789 -Bastille no Koibitotachi- (2018)
 Romantic Act "Rurouni Kenshin" (2018)
 Romeo & Juliette (2019)
 Elisabeth (2019)
 Love's Labour's Lost (2019)
 Mary Stuart (2020)

Discography

Single
 Natsu dayo HONEY!! - July 11, 2012 - Single debut
 Natsu dayo HONEY!!
 MissTerious
 Ashita he no SPEED
 Kimi he no X'mas Song - November 21, 2012 ("Anata no tame ni" the main theme song for PIECE: Kioku no Kakera movie)
 Kimi he no X'mas Song
 Anata no tame ni
 Dare yori kimi ni chikai basho de
 escape - May 22, 2013
 escape
 Bad Dream
 All the way
PEARL/GET UP - February 11, 2015
 PEARL
 GET UP

Digital Single
 JUSTICE ~tada kimi no subete wo mitsumeteiru~ - September 7, 2016

Mini Single
 Drive you crazy / Beep Beep - December 17, 2011

Soundtrack Movie
 Time Judged All - (Kamen Rider OOO ft. Watanabe Shu) - July 27, 2011
 Te wo tsunagou~Matsuken × Kamen Rider Samba~ (Kamen Rider OOO ft. Matsudaira Ken & Watanabe Shu) - August 3, 2011
 Hoshikuzu Kyoudai no densetsu (The Legend of The Stardust Brothers) - October 4, 2017
 Hoshikage no Baraddo (Ballad of the Shadow Star) - January 10, 2018

Album
 Ryosuke Miura Summer Live 2012 CD - August 13, 2014. Included in the DVD edition with a collection of singles:

 Color - December 7, 2016
 JUSTICE ~tada kimi no subete wo mitsumeteiru~
 Shimauma
 Dancing in the Air
 Time Rocket
 Yumebana

DVD
 Bitter, milky taste (March 19, 2008, Pony Canyon )
 From LA with LOVE Ryosuke Miura (January 25, 2013, Japan time)
 Ryosuke Miura Summer Live 2012  (August 13, 2014, Avex Marketing)

References

External links

 三浦涼介オフィシャルファンクラブ＆オフィシャルショップ｜Rose Mate ローズメイト 

1987 births
Living people
Japanese male actors
Japanese people of New Zealand descent
People from Tokyo